Mountain Rangers was the nickname of an Oregon militia regiment formed during the American Civil War. A mounted unit, the Mountain Rangers were officially Company A, 1st Regiment, 1st Brigade, Oregon State Militia.

During the Civil War the State of Oregon organized militias to replace the Federal troops who had been recalled for the war. Organized on May 18, 1863 in Ashland, the Mountain Rangers were organized as an independent military company, the only one in Southern Oregon. The men approved a constitution and bylaws, and elected their officers and NCO's. They agreed to buy military fatigue caps, furnish their own horses and wear grey shirts and blue overalls. Officers wore U. S. military uniforms. For the Fourth of July, the Mountain Rangers ordered new uniforms with matching dark blue coats and pants. Jackson County officials rented a saloon in Ashland to serve as an armory for weapons and ammunition supplied by the state.

The Rangers were primarily a marching and social organization with many of the region's leading citizens in the ranks. Prominent Oregon pioneer Abel Helman served as captain. A highlight for the Oregon militiamen was the Military Ball at the Ashland Hotel on Jan. 8, 1864, in celebration of the anniversary of the Battle of New Orleans.

The Mountain Rangers are one of the best documented Oregon militia units because of the meticulous journal kept by company journalist and future captain Oliver Applegate.

The Oregon volunteer troops were demobilized beginning in 1866 when federal troops moved back into the northwest. No longer did the citizens of Oregon nor the state legislature consider the need for a well-armed and disciplined reserve force.

See also
Oregon in the American Civil War

References 

Military in Oregon
Military units and formations in Oregon
Units and formations of the Union Army from Oregon
Military units and formations established in 1863
Military units and formations disestablished in 1867
1863 establishments in Oregon
1867 disestablishments in Oregon